Nirian Sinal Iznaga (born in Ciego de Ávila, Ciego de Ávila Province) is a female beach volleyball player from Cuba, who participated in the Qualification Tournament in the SWATCH-FIVB U-21 Women's World Championship in Mysłowice, Poland, partnering Kirenia Reina.
She also represented her native country at the NORCECA Beach Volleyball Circuit in the 2008, playing with Ion Canet; and 2009, playing with Kirenia Ballar.

References

External links
 
 

Year of birth missing (living people)
Living people
Cuban beach volleyball players
Women's beach volleyball players
People from Ciego de Ávila